John Michael Bukowski (18 January 1939 – 20 February 2001) was an Australian boxer. He competed at the 1960 Summer Olympics and the 1964 Summer Olympics. At the 1960 Summer Olympics, he defeated Abrie Schutte of South Africa, before losing to Boris Lagutin of the Soviet Union.

References

External links
 

1939 births
2001 deaths
Australian male boxers
Light-middleweight boxers
Olympic boxers of Australia
Boxers at the 1960 Summer Olympics
Boxers at the 1964 Summer Olympics
Sportspeople from Mackay, Queensland